Darren Weir (born 1999) is a Scottish international lawn and indoor bowler.

Bowls career
Weir won the Scottish under-18 title in 2016 and is a three times consecutive Scottish under-21 champion indoors (2018–20).

In 2019, Weir was selected for the European Bowls Championships, where he won two silver medals. He made his debut at the indoor World Championships during the 2021 World Indoor Bowls Championship. 

He was twice defeated in the final of both the 2022 and 2023 Under 25 World Bowls Championship by fellow Scot Daniel Pool.

Personal life
He works as a Communications Officer for Bowls Scotland.

References

Scottish male bowls players
1999 births
Living people